Te or TE may refer to:

Businesses 
 TE Connectivity, a connectivity and sensor component company
 Air New Zealand (former IATA airline code TE, from 1965 to 1990)
 FlyLal (IATA airline code TE)
 Tasman Empire Airways Limited (former IATA airline code TE, from 1939 to 1965)
 Telecom Egypt, an Egyptian telephone company
 Telecom Éireann, defunct Irish national telephone company
 TotalEnergies, a French energy and petroleum company

Language
 Te (cuneiform), a cuneiform sign
 Te (Cyrillic) (Т, т), a letter in the Cyrillic alphabet
 Te (kana) (て, テ), a Japanese kana
 Telugu language (ISO 639-1 code "te")

People
 Aregado Mantenque Té (born c. 1963), Guinea-Bissau politician and leader of the Workers' Party 
 Emiliano Té (born 1983), Bissau-Guinean footballer
 Ricardo Vaz Tê (born 1986), Portuguese footballer

Science and technology

Biology and medicine
 TE buffer, a commonly used buffer solution in molecular biology
 Ilex cookii, a plant commonly called "Te"
 Terminologia Embryologica, an international standard for human embryology nomenclature
 Thalidomide embryopathy, a congenital deformation related to the use of the drug thalidomide
 Thioescaline, a psychoactive drug
 Transformation efficiency, the efficiency by which cells can take up extracellular DNA and express genes encoded by it
 Transposable element, a sequence of DNA that can move about in the genome, including transposons
 Echo time in magnetic resonance imaging

Other uses in science and technology
 TE cooler, a solid-state electronic cooler
 TE mode, a type of transverse mode of electromagnetic radiation
 Extraverted thinking, in the Myers–Briggs Type Indicator
 Tellurium, symbol Te, a chemical element
 Test engineer, a professional that designs testing processes
 Type enforcement, an IT security concept

Sport

 Te (martial arts), the Okinawan martial arts
 Tight end, a position in American football

Other uses 
 "te", a name for the lowered seventh pitch of the musical scale in solfège
 De (Chinese), also transliterated as Te, a concept in Chinese philosophy
 Province of Teramo, Italy, vehicle registration
 TE, vehicle registration plates for Tetovo, a city in the Republic of Macedonia
 Palazzo del Te, a palace in Mantua, Italy
"Te", a song by Macintosh Plus from Floral Shoppe

See also
 Teh (disambiguation)